Alexis Lewis  is an American inventor, repeat science fair winner and public speaker. She is best known for her advocacy for invention education and her humanitarian inventions. She is known to have given talks at the White House, Smithsonian, SXSW, National Maker Faire, the 2018 Social Innovation Summit, and at TEDx events. Lewis also gained repeat standing as a finalist or winner in national and international science and invention fairs, including the 2012 Broadcom MASTERS Challenge. In the course of the Spark!Lab Invent It Challenge, Lewis won pro-bono patent counsel, and holds a patent on the "Rescue Travois", granted 2015 and has one pending, on the "Emergency Mask Pod".

Additionally, In 2019, Lewis served on the selection committee of Tool Foundry, a science tools accelerator, and in 2013, she served as a representative of LEGO Education at the 2013 FIRST World Championship.

Documentaries
Lewis has been featured in two mini-documentaries:

 2015 Smithsonian mini-documentary "Teen Inventor Alexis Lewis on Youth and the Innovative Spirit"
 2017 The Stem 10, a series of mini-documentaries featuring Alexis Lewis, Jaden Smith and others

Advisory positions

 Tool Foundry Accelerator Selection Committee 
 Lifeboat Foundation
 Education Board
 Engineering Board 
 Futurists Board
 Media & Arts Board
 Space Settlement Board

Speaking engagements

 TEDxAshburn, 2014
 Smithsonian-USPTO Innovation Family Festival, 2015
 Obama-White House address: National Week of Making, 2015
 TEDxUNC 2015
 South By Southwest (SXSW), 2017
 Social Innovation Summit, 2018

Awards and recognition

 2012 Broadcom MASTERS 1st in Engineering
 2012 Spark!Lab Invent It Challenge winner
 2012 Finalist in Discovery Education 3M Young Scientist Challenge
 2013 Iron Man 3 Inventor and Innovator Fair winner
 2014 Spark!Lab Invent It Challenge winner
 2014 Big Hero 6 Inventor and Innovator Fair winner
2016 Scholastic Gold Key in Poetry

References 

21st-century American inventors
University of North Carolina alumni
Women inventors
Living people
1999 births